Charles Waterhouse   (1 July 1893 – 2 March 1975)  was a British Conservative Party politician.

Biography
Born in Salford, the second surviving son of Thomas Crompton Waterhouse, of Lomberdale Hall, Bakewell, Derbyshire, he was educated at Cheltenham and at Trinity Hall, Cambridge, graduating with an MA degree in Economics in 1914.

Waterhouse served in World War I in France with the 1st Life Guards. In 1917 he married Beryl Ford, and the couple had two sons and one daughter.

He was unsuccessful parliamentary candidate in Derbyshire North-East at the 1922 General Election and 1923 General Election. He was elected as Member of Parliament (MP) for Leicester South at the 1924 General Election, holding the seat until his defeat in 1945 General Election. He was re-elected for Leicester South-East in 1950, holding that seat until 1957.

Waterhouse held office as Parliamentary Private Secretary to the President of the Board of Trade in 1928; and to the Minister of Labour from 1931 to 1934. He progressed through the Whip's office, holding posts as an Assistant Whip in 1935–1936, a Junior Lord of the Treasury in 1936, Comptroller of the Household in 1937–1939 and Treasurer of the Household in 1939. He then held office as Assistant Postmaster-General from 1939 to 1941,  Parliamentary Secretary to the Board of Trade from 1941 to 1945. He chaired Tanganyika Concessions from 1957 to 1966.

He was appointed a Privy Counsellor in 1944. He was a Deputy Lieutenant and Justice of the Peace for Derbyshire. He died in Sheffield aged 82.

References

External links 
 

1893 births
1975 deaths
Alumni of Trinity Hall, Cambridge
British Life Guards officers
Conservative Party (UK) MPs for English constituencies
Deputy Lieutenants of Derbyshire
English justices of the peace
Members of the Privy Council of the United Kingdom
Ministers in the Chamberlain peacetime government, 1937–1939
Ministers in the Chamberlain wartime government, 1939–1940
Ministers in the Churchill caretaker government, 1945
Ministers in the Churchill wartime government, 1940–1945
Parliamentary Secretaries to the Board of Trade
Recipients of the Military Cross
Treasurers of the Household
UK MPs 1924–1929
UK MPs 1929–1931
UK MPs 1931–1935
UK MPs 1935–1945
UK MPs 1950–1951
UK MPs 1951–1955
UK MPs 1955–1959